St. Peter's Boys High School is an American Catholic all-boys' high school, located in the West New Brighton area of the Staten Island borough of New York City, New York.

The school is affiliated with the Christian Brothers of St. John Baptist de la Salle, and is a member of the Catholic High School Athletic Association. 

The school is located at 200 Clinton Avenue and is part of St. Peter's parish on Staten Island, which also ran a grammar school and all-girls' high school.

History

Origins
The school's origins can be traced back to 1839, with the dedication of St. Peter's parish.

With the arrival of three Christian Brothers in 1917, the school was founded on Richmond Terrace in the New Brighton area of Staten Island. 

Father Joseph Farrell and other local clergy took over operation of the school in 1920 when the Brothers were withdrawn due to World War I. The Brothers would return ten years later in 1930. At this time, there were more Brothers at the school than ever before. 

In 1937, the school's main campus was designated as a junior college of Manhattan College, another Lasallian institution. By 1943, the junior college closed and St. Peter's Boys High School relocated to that campus. The school's main campus has remained there since, on the corner of Clinton and Henderson Avenues.

The school maintains an  alumni community, including the St. Peter's High School Glee Club and Seton Chorale Alumni who organize an annual scholarship benefit Christmas concert for its late instructor, Carl Lesch.

The modern era
In 1965, the Roman Catholic Archdiocese of New York agreed to assist in the funding of a new gymnasium, which would also serve as the school's auditorium.

By 1969, however, the school's closing was imminent. The community rallied around St. Peter's and local support prevented the school from closing.

As of the 2019–2020 school year, the school's enrollment was 466 students.

The Brothers' involvement in the school has been in decline due to a continual decrease in men entering the Institute of the Brothers of the Christian Schools. 

In 2001, eight Brothers taught at the school along with two Sisters of St. Joseph and 31 lay faculty members. 

In 2009, the varsity football team won the CHSAA single A championship 41–0 against the Bishop Ford Central Catholic High School Falcons.

Academics
St. Peter's is accredited by the  New York State Board of Regents. The school is operated by the Brothers of the Christian Schools, a Roman Catholic order of consecrated religious men  St. Peter's is also a member of the Middle States Association of Colleges and Schools.

Curriculum

All students enrolled are expected to complete an academic program that includes four courses within the Religion Department, four courses within the English Department, four courses within the History Department, three within the Math Department, two courses in the sciences, three language courses, as well as an art & music course, a health course, four years of physical education, and usually three elective courses. All "scholars students" are also required to complete at least two years of Latin.

Notable alumni

 
 
 
 
 
 
 ; executive director, Workforce Development Institute

Notable faculty

Notes and references

External links
 

1917 establishments in New York City
Boys' schools in New York City
Educational institutions established in 1917
New York City
Roman Catholic high schools in Staten Island
West New Brighton, Staten Island